Kashal is a village and gram panchayat in India, situated in Mawal taluka of Pune district in the state of Maharashtra.

Administration
The village is administrated by a sarpanch, an elected representative who leads a gram panchayat. At the time of the 2011 Census of India, the village was the headquarters for the eponymous gram panchayat, which also governed the village of Kivale.

Demographics
At the 2011 census, the village comprised 181 households. The population of 978 was split between 491 males and 487 females.

Air travel connectivity 
The closest airport to the village is Pune Airport.

See also
List of villages in Mawal taluka

References

Villages in Mawal taluka
Gram Panchayats in Pune district